The following events occurred in October 1925:

October 1, 1925 (Thursday)
Thousands in the state of Guanajuato in Mexico were left homeless after the Lerma River flooded.
The Kraków University of Economics opened in Poland.
Born: Christine (d. 2005) and Diana (d. 2015) of the Pullein-Thompson sisters, British writers of pony books

October 2, 1925 (Friday)
Spanish troops entered the Rif Republic capital of Ajdir.
Josephine Baker starred in the new cabaret production "La Revue Nègre" at the Théâtre des Champs-Élysées in Paris, where she quickly became a sensation.
In Richmond, Virginia, several workers were buried alive when the Church Hill Tunnel collapsed. One man was able to escape, giving rise to an urban legend known as the Richmond Vampire.

October 3, 1925 (Saturday)
The American aircraft carrier  was launched.
Born: Gore Vidal, writer and public intellectual, in West Point, New York (d. 2012)

October 4, 1925 (Sunday)
The Hama uprising broke out in Syria.
S2, a Finnish Sokol class torpedo boat, was sank during a fierce storm near the coast of Pori in the Gulf of Bothnia,  taking with the whole crew of 53.
After eleven years of limited Prohibition, the Soviet Union removed all restrictions on the alcohol content of beverages.

October 5, 1925 (Monday)
The Locarno Conference began in Locarno, Switzerland between several European powers to negotiate a security pact.
Born: Gail Davis, actress, in Little Rock, Arkansas (d. 2005)

October 6, 1925 (Tuesday)
The Locarno Conference debated the matter of France wanting assurance of the right to cross through Germany to help Poland and Czechoslovakia in the event of war.

October 7, 1925 (Wednesday)
Germany and France reached a deadlock in Locarno over the Poland and Czechoslovakia matter.
Born: Mildred Earp, baseball player, in West Fork, Arkansas (d. 2017)
Died: Christy Mathewson, 45, baseball pitcher (tuberculosis)

October 8, 1925 (Thursday)
Cuban airline Cubana de Aviación was founded.
The city of Belgrade in Serbia was awarded the Czechoslovak War Cross 1918.

October 9, 1925 (Friday)
The Italian state prosecutor absolved twenty-four officials of any responsibility for the June 1924 Giacomo Matteotti murder, ruling that they might have ordered the "sequestration" of Matteotti but not his murder, nor would they have had any knowledge of it.
Lithuania held the first day of a three-day mourning period for the loss of Vilnius to Poland in 1920. Many demonstrations were staged in which speakers declared that Lithuania would not have any relations with Poland until Vilnius was returned.
Died: Hugo Preuß, 64, German lawyer and politician

October 10, 1925 (Saturday)
About 15 people were killed in Catanzaro in Italy when a train plunged over a bridge after high floodwaters weakened the bridge's supports.
Police in Panama killed two people when they opened fire on an open-air labor union meeting discussing what to do about national rent increases.
The American Federation of Labor called for a nationwide boycott of non-union products to eliminate child labour and obtain better working conditions.
Died: James Buchanan Duke, 68, American tobacco manufacturer and philanthropist

October 11, 1925 (Sunday)
Powers at Locarno agreed on an arrangement in which, with regard to military obligations in the League of Nations, due consideration would be given to Germany's special military status until such time as a general arms reduction plan could be implemented across Europe. This was thought to remove the main obstacle to Germany's entry into the League of Nations.
Panama City was effectively shut down by protestors angered by the shooting of the previous day.
Born: Elmore Leonard, novelist and screenwriter, in New Orleans, Louisiana (d. 2013)

October 12, 1925 (Monday)
A contingent of 600 U.S. troops entered Panama at the request of President Rodolfo Chiari to put down a massive renter's strike.
Two people were killed and 70 arrested in Paris during clashes between police and communists who were calling for a general strike in protest of the Rif War. Communist Deputy Jacques Doriot was among those arrested.
Germany and the Soviet Union signed a commercial treaty designed to increase mutual trade.

October 13, 1925 (Tuesday)
The British seaman's outlaw strike ended. It continued in Australia, however.
John W. Weeks resigned as United States Secretary of War due to failing health.
The jewels stolen from Mrs. Jessie Woolworth Donahue on September 30 were returned by a private detective agency. No public statement was given regarding the circumstances of their recovery.
Born: 
Lenny Bruce, comedian, in Mineola, New York (d. 1966)
Margaret Thatcher, Prime Minister of the United Kingdom, in Grantham, Lincolnshire, England (d. 2013)

October 14, 1925 (Wednesday)
The Treaty of Friendship, Commerce and Consular Relations between Germany and the United States of America was ratified in Washington, D.C.
Dwight F. Davis became United States Secretary of War. 
French forces withdrew from Damascus amid rioting after the French displayed corpses of Druze rebels.
Landlords in Panama agreed to roll back rent increases to placate angry demonstrators.
Died: Eugen Sandow, 58, German bodybuilder known as the "father of modern bodybuilding"

October 15, 1925 (Thursday)
The Pittsburgh Pirates won the World Series, defeating the Washington Senators, 9 to 7, in Game 7. 
Dongdaemun Stadium opened in Seoul, Korea.
The P.G. Wodehouse novel Sam the Sudden was published.

October 16, 1925 (Friday)
The Locarno conference ended with several agreements in place. German Foreign Minister Gustav Stresemann gave a closing speech in which he said the conference spelled a new era in European relationships, while French Foreign Minister Aristide Briand said it marked the beginning of a new epoch of cooperation and friendship.
Born: Angela Lansbury, actress and singer, in Regent's Park, London, England

October 17, 1925 (Saturday)
Twelve people were killed and 20 hurt in a train collision on the Milan–Genoa railway line in Italy.

October 18, 1925 (Sunday)
The French began a 48-hour bombardment of Damascus.
The film Little Annie Rooney starring Mary Pickford was released.
Wankdorf Stadium opened in Bern, Switzerland.

October 19, 1925 (Monday)
The Incident at Petrich occurred near the Bulgarian town of Petrich on the border with Greece, when at least one Greek soldier was shot by someone on the Bulgarian side. Conflicting accounts exist as to what led up to the incident, but one holds that a Greek soldier was running across the border after his dog, which is why the incident is sometimes called "The War of the Stray Dog".

October 20, 1925 (Tuesday)
the U.S. Department of War announced that Col. Billy Mitchell would be court-martialed for insubordination.
The Goodman Theatre opened in Chicago.
Born: Art Buchwald, humorist, in New York City (d. 2007); Gene Wood, television personality, in Quincy, Massachusetts (d. 2004)

October 21, 1925 (Wednesday)
Greece delivered a 48-hour ultimatum  to the Bulgarian government demanding they pay an indemnity and apologize for the Incident at Petrich.
Born: Celia Cruz, salsa performer, in Havana, Cuba (d. 2003)
Died: Marv Goodwin, 34, baseball pitcher, believed to be the first professional athlete to die as the result of a plane crash

October 22, 1925 (Thursday)
Greek soldiers reportedly occupied the town of Petrich with the intention of enforcing the country's demands for satisfaction.
Born: Robert Rauschenberg, artist, in Port Arthur, Texas (d. 2008)

October 23, 1925 (Friday)
French Foreign Minister Aristide Briand called for an extraordinary session of the League of Nations to resolve the conflict between Greece and Bulgaria.
Born: Johnny Carson, television host, in Corning, Iowa (d. 2005)

October 24, 1925 (Saturday)
Greece and Bulgaria agreed to allow the League of Nations to mediate in their dispute.
Born: Bob Azzam, singer, in Alexandria, Egypt (d. 2004); Luciano Berio, composer, in Oneglia, Italy (d. 2003); Al Feldstein, writer, editor and artist, in Brooklyn, New York (d. 2014)

October 25, 1925 (Sunday)
Former Nicaraguan President Emiliano Chamorro Vargas took over the mountain-top fortress of La Loma overlooking Managua and demanded that President Carlos José Solórzano make him Minister of War.
The romantic comedy film The King on Main Street starring Bessie Love and Adolphe Menjou was released.
Switzerland held a federal election in which the Free Democratic Party maintained its plurality.

October 26, 1925 (Monday)
Nicaraguan President Solórzano acquiesced to Emiliano Chamorro's demand and made him Minister of War, essentially giving him control of the country.
The League of Nations ordered a cessation of hostilities between Greece and Bulgaria and gave them 24 hours to bring their troops back behind their respective borders.
The British-German drama film The Blackguard was released.

October 27, 1925 (Tuesday)
Born: Warren Christopher, 63rd United States Secretary of State, in Scranton, North Dakota (d. 2011)

October 28, 1925 (Wednesday)
The court-martial of Col. Billy Mitchell began in Washington, D.C.
The Polish crime film Vampires of Warsaw was released.

October 29, 1925 (Thursday)
The Balkan crisis ended as Greece completed its withdrawal from Bulgaria. The League of Nations said it would appoint a commission to assign responsibilities and assess damages.
In the Canadian federal election, the Conservative Party led by Arthur Meighen won a plurality of seats. However, Liberal Prime Minister William Lyon Mackenzie King formed a coalition with the Progressive Party to stay in power.
73-year-old Waddy Thompson Ligon was killed when his converted Model T slid off a narrow road south of Lees Ferry and jammed into a crevasse of the Grand Canyon.
Born: Dominick Dunne, writer and journalist, in Hartford, Connecticut (d. 2009); Robert Hardy, actor, in Cheltenham, England (d. 2017)

October 30, 1925 (Friday)
The murder trial of Ossian Sweet began with an all-white jury and Clarence Darrow representing the defense.

October 31, 1925 (Saturday)
Exiled Shah of Persia Ahmad Shah Qajar was formally deposed by Persian Parliament, ending the Qajar dynasty. The path was cleared for Prime Minister Reza Khan to assume the throne.
Born: John Pople, chemist and Nobel Prize laureate, in Burnham-on-Sea, England (d. 2004)
Died: Mikhail Frunze, 40, Soviet Union Commisar for Military and Naval Affairs, during a routine operation; Max Linder, 41, French actor and filmmaker (double suicide with wife)

References

1925
1925-10
1925-10